The 2019 Kurume U.S.E Cup was a professional tennis tournament played on outdoor carpet courts. It was the fifteenth edition of the tournament which was part of the 2019 ITF Women's World Tennis Tour. It took place in Kurume, Japan between 13 and 19 May 2019.

Singles main-draw entrants

Seeds

 1 Rankings are as of 6 May 2019.

Other entrants
The following players received wildcards into the singles main draw:
  Sakura Hondo
  Misaki Matsuda
  Kanako Morisaki
  Naho Sato

The following players received entry from the qualifying draw:
  Haruna Arakawa
  Mana Ayukawa
  Ayumi Miyamoto
  Yuki Naito
  Ena Shibahara
  Yuuki Tanaka

The following player received entry as a lucky loser:
  Alexandra Bozovic
  Himeno Sakatsume

Champions

Singles

 Rebecca Marino def.  Yuki Naito, 6–4, 7–6(7–0)

Doubles

 Hiroko Kuwata /  Ena Shibahara def.  Erina Hayashi /  Moyuka Uchijima, 0–6, 6–4, [10–5]

References

External links
 2019 Kurume U.S.E Cup at ITFtennis.com
 Official website

2019 ITF Women's World Tennis Tour
2019 in Japanese tennis
Kurume Best Amenity Cup